Ambush is a 1939 American drama film directed by Kurt Neumann and written by Laura Perelman and S. J. Perelman. The film stars Gladys Swarthout, Lloyd Nolan, William "Bill" Henry, William Frawley, Ernest Truex and Broderick Crawford. The film was released on January 20, 1939, by Paramount Pictures.

Plot

Charlie Hartman is part of a gang bossed by a criminal named Gibbs that pulls off a daring robbery in broad daylight. Charlie's honest sister Jane ends up being taken hostage but manages to convey her dire need for help to a truck driver, Tony Andrews.

Tony attempts to help save Jane and, if possible, her brother as well. Pretending to help Gibbs and the thieves, he leaves clues for the police to follow. One of the crooks, Blue, is killed, after which another, Randall, attempts to escape after Charlie's guilty conscience causes a change of heart. Tony is able to free Jane from the clutches of Gibbs, after which he and Jane collect the reward and begin to plan a new life together.

Cast 

 Gladys Swarthout as Jane Hartman
 Lloyd Nolan as Tony Andrews
 William "Bill" Henry as Charlie Hartman
 William Frawley as Inspector J.L. Weber
 Ernest Truex as Mr. Gibbs
 Broderick Crawford as Randall
 Rufe Davis as Centerville Sheriff
 Richard Denning as Police Garage Mechanic
 John Hartley as Sidney Blue
 Antonio Moreno as Captain Mike Gonzalez
 Harry Fleischmann as Captain Bosen
 Clem Bevans as Pop Stebbins
 Max Hoffman Jr. as Motorcycle Officer Sam Moore
 Archie Twitchell as Bank Teller
 Jane Dewey as Mother at Restaurant
 Billy Lee as Boy at Restaurant
 Polly Moran as Cora
 Wade Boteler as Bank Guard Riley
 George Melford as Bank President Wales

Other uncredited cast members (alphabetically)

 Eddie Acuff as Bus Conductor
 Ethel Clayton as Bank Customer
 Raymond Hatton as Mosher - Hardware Storekeeper
 Al Hill as Deputy
 Robert Homans as Garage Watchman
 Olin Howland as Radio Actor (segment "Uncle Toby")
 Lew Kelly as Farmer
 Sammy McKim as Boy With Wagon
 Gene Morgan as Reporter
 James Pierce as Officer Mack McKelway
 Buddy Roosevelt as Reporter
 Dick Rush as Metzger
 Guy Usher as Detective at Mosher's
 Virginia Vale as Waitress at Restaurant
 Bryant Washburn as Reporter
 Clarence Wilson as Lafe, Centerville Storekeeper

Production
Ambush is one of five film produced by Paramount in the 1930s featuring Gladys Swarthout, a very popular Metropolitan Opera mezzo-soprano. The studio was attempting to build on the popularity of Grace Moore, another opera singer, who had also expanded her talents into films.

See also
 Rose of the Rancho (1936)
 Give Us This Night (1936)
 Champagne Waltz (1937)
 Romance in the Dark (1938)

References

External links 
 
 
 
 

1939 films
Paramount Pictures films
American drama films
1939 drama films
Films directed by Kurt Neumann
American black-and-white films
1930s English-language films
1930s American films